Chrysocercops shoreae is a moth of the family Gracillariidae. It is known from Terengganu and Pahang, Malaysia.

The wingspan is 5–6.6 mm.

The larvae feed on Shorea materialis. They mine the leaves of their host plant.

References

Chrysocercops
Moths described in 1992